Tommaso Martini (Bivongi, Calabria, 1688 – 5 January 1755) was an Italian painter of the late-Baroque period.

Biography
By 1723, he had moved to Naples. He is said to have trained with Francesco Solimena, and later under Luca Giordano. He was active in Naples and Rome. He painted an altarpiece of "Virgin and Saints" for the church of Chiesa della SS. Trinità in Petrizzi.

References

18th-century Italian painters
Italian male painters
Italian Baroque painters
Painters from Naples
1688 births
1755 deaths
18th-century Italian male artists